The Laurel River is a  tributary of the Cumberland River in southeast Kentucky in the United States. The river drains a rural region in the foothills of the Appalachian Mountains, in parts of Whitley and Laurel Counties.

The river is impounded near its mouth by Laurel River Dam, which forms Laurel River Lake. Completed in 1974 by the U.S. Army Corps of Engineers, the dam and reservoir serve mainly for flood control, although some hydroelectricity is also produced.

The river was likely named for thick growth of laurel along its banks.

See also
List of rivers of Kentucky

References

Rivers of Kentucky
Tributaries of the Cumberland River
Rivers of Whitley County, Kentucky
Rivers of Laurel County, Kentucky